The 2008 Brabantse Pijl was the 48th edition of the Brabantse Pijl cycle race and was held on 30 March 2008. The race started in Leuven and finished in Alsemberg. The race was won by Sylvain Chavanel.

General classification

References

2008
Brabantse Pijl